The Sangley Massacre occurred in June 1662 when the governor of the Captaincy General of the Philippines ordered the killing of any Sangley (Chinese Filipinos) who had not submitted to the assembly area.

Anti-Chinese sentiment had been prevalent in Spanish ruled Philippines since the early 17th century, resulting in the Sangley Rebellion and the 2nd Sangley Rebellion (1639). In early 1662, the victorious Southern Ming warlord Zheng Chenggong defeated the Dutch at the Siege of Fort Zeelandia in Taiwan. On 24 April 1662, Zheng sent a message to Manila demanding the Spanish to pay tribute to him or else he would send a fleet to conquer them. The message arrived on 5 May. The Spanish took the threat very seriously and withdrew their forces from the Moluccas and Mindano to strengthen Manila in preparation for an attack. The Chinese and Filipinos were forced to build food supplies and contribute labor to improving the city walls. Some argued for killing all non-Christian Chinese. The Chinese started to flee even while the Spanish tried to reassure them and keep things quiet.

On 24 May, a disturbance occurred in the Chinese settlement resulting in casualties on both sides. The Spanish fire their cannons at the Chinese. The Spanish governor ordered the Chinese to submit and all non-Christian Chinese to leave Manila. It's uncertain how many left, but 1,300 Chinese were mentioned to have departed on a single boat. On 4 June, the Spanish ordered for all Chinese who had not submitted to an assembly area to be killed. Those who were not killed fled to the mountains where they died of starvation or were killed by Negritos.

References

Bibliography

Chinese diaspora in the Philippines
History of Manila
History of the Philippines (1565–1898)
Rebellions in the Philippines

Anti-Chinese violence in Asia